House of Chetao (also referred to as Chetaw) is a Circassian knightly house of Abdzakh Princedom of Circassia. They are found in Republic of Adygea and Krasnodar Krai, Russian Federation; as well as in Republic of Turkey, Syrian Arab Republic, Hashemite Kingdom of Jordan and Republic of Iraq due to Circassian Genocide in present day.
There are three main claims about the former place of residence of Chetao House: Tube(Nowadays Tuby), Mezmay, and Khidizh(nowadays Khadyzhensk).

Etymology
Chetao (Чэтао), meaning "the one who bears the sword" or "the one who utilises the sword" or simply "swordsman" in Circassian, suggesting that the founder of the house had an exquisite skill in swordsmanship.

Notable members

References

Circassian houses